Green Township is one of the twelve townships of Hamilton County, Ohio, United States.  The 2020 census found 60,424 people in the township. It was founded in 1809.

Geography
Located in the west central part of the county, it borders the following townships and city:
Colerain Township - north
Cincinnati - east
Delhi Township - south
Miami Township - west

Two cities occupy what was once part of Green Township: Cheviot in the east center, and Cincinnati, the county seat of Hamilton County, in the east and southeast.  Nearly all of the remainder of the township is part of one of the following census-designated places:
Bridgetown, in the center
Covedale, in the south
Dent, in the northwest
Mack, in the west and southwest
Monfort Heights, in the northeast, south of White Oak
White Oak, in the northeast

The township encompasses 27.9 sq mi (72.3 km) of gently rolling hills above the Ohio River northwest of downtown Cincinnati. As of 1990, over 50% of the township's area has been was converted to urban use, largely as a suburb of Cincinnati; 38% is classed as forested, and 11% as farmland.

Name and history
It is one of sixteen Green Townships statewide.

The township was originally held intact by John Cleves Symmes, with the apparent intent of naming it as the academy township for his purchase. In 1802 a court order awarded half the township to one of his Miami Company investors, Elias Boudinot. This became part of the disputes over the entire Symmes Purchase. The township is named after Nathanael Greene, a Revolutionary War general.

The township was home to The Western Hills Airport (Also called "Frank Airport" and "Cheviot Airport") and was the first airport in western Hamilton County, Ohio. The airport was located into the neighborhood of Bridgetown, Ohio. Airport operations began in 1929, shutdown during World War II, then reopened after the end of the war, slowly declining until the corporation ceased services in 1949 as aircraft outgrew the facilities.

Government
The township is governed by a three-member board of trustees, who are elected in November of odd-numbered years to a four-year term beginning on the following January 1. Two are elected in the year after the presidential election and one is elected in the year before it. There is also an elected township fiscal officer, who serves a four-year term beginning on April 1 of the year after the election, which is held in November of the year before the presidential election. Vacancies in the fiscal officership or on the board of trustees are filled by the remaining trustees.

Parks
Green Township has a township park system with six different parks including:
Bicentennial Park
Blue Rock Park
Bosken Park
Kuliga Park
Veterans Park
West Fork Park

Education

Catholic schools
There are several Catholic schools in Green Township. This includes LaSalle High School, St. Antoninus, Our Lady of Visitation, St. Aloysius Gonzaga, St. Jude, St. James White Oak, and St. Ignatius.

Public schools
Most of Green Township is within the Oak Hills Local School District. The Monfort Heights and White Oak areas of Green Township are within the Northwest Local School District.

Within the Oak Hills Local School District:

Oakdale Elementary School, Bridgetown Middle School and Oak Hills High School are within Bridgetown, Green Township. John F. Dulles Elementary School is within Mack. Springmyer Elementary School is also within Mack.

Within the Northwest Local School District:

Two Northwest schools are located in Green Township. Monfort Heights Elementary School serves Monfort Heights students, while White Oak Middle School serves White Oak and Monfort Heights students.

Three Northwest schools located in Colerain Township serve Green Township students.
Ann Weigel Elementary School and Struble Elementary School serve White Oak students, while Colerain High School serves Monfort Heights and White Oak students.

Public libraries
Public Library of Cincinnati and Hamilton County operates the Green Township Branch in Mack and the Monfort Heights Branch in Monfort Heights. The Green Township branch, which opened in January 1990, has a central copper dome with two smaller domed structures, which were designed to resemble barns of horse farms which at one time prevalent in Green Township.

Notable people
John Cranley, 69th Mayor of Cincinnati
Rocky Boiman, former professional American football linebacker and ESPN commentator
Todd Portune, politician 
John A. Gurley, U.S. Congressman from Ohio
Steve Driehaus, politician
Patrick Osborne, Academy Award-winning animator

References

External links 
Township website

Townships in Hamilton County, Ohio
Townships in Ohio
1809 establishments in Ohio